Róbert Szegedi (born 26 May 1985) is a Slovak football player of Hungarian ethnic origin who currently plays for Slovak 3. liga club ŠKF Sereď.

References
at Fotbalportal.cz
at Guardian Football

Slovak footballers
Living people
1985 births
FC Zbrojovka Brno players
FK Inter Bratislava players
FK Senica players
MŠK Novohrad Lučenec players
Slovak Super Liga players
Expatriate footballers in the Czech Republic

Association football midfielders